A sixteen-year-old girl was burned to death in Río Bravo, Suchitepéquez, Guatemala, in May 2015 by a vigilante mob after being accused by some of involvement in the killing of a moto taxi driver. A video of the lynching was later uploaded to YouTube and widely circulated on Guatemalan social media.

Lynching 

The lynching took place on 10 May 2015 in the Guatemalan village of Río Bravo. According to local media, the sixteen-year-old girl had been accused of being involved in the murder of Carlos Enrique González Noriega, a 68-year-old moto taxi driver. Residents claimed the girl, along with two other men, shot González Noriega after he had refused to pay protection money. The two male accomplices escaped, but the girl was captured by a mob and dragged to the town center.

A crowd of at least one hundred people—including women and children—watched as she was repeatedly punched and kicked by vigilantes. Police attempted to intervene, but were blocked from the area by the mob. After being severely beaten, a member of the crowd doused the girl in gasoline and burned her to death.

Video

Seven days after the lynching, a video of the attack surfaced online. The video was uploaded to YouTube, where it received thousands of views before being removed. The video was also widely shared on Guatemalan social media networks, where it prompted debate on vigilante justice.

The video has also been shared on social media with captions falsely claiming that the girl was a Hindu from Madhya Pradesh, India who was burned alive for attending a prayer service at a Christian church. Following the Fall of Kabul in 2021, the video was once again circulated on social media, this time being purported to depict an Afghan girl.

See also 

 Crime and violence in Latin America
 Crime in Guatemala
 Extrajudicial punishment
 Violence against women in Guatemala

References 

2015 deaths
Murder in Guatemala
Law of Guatemala
Society of Guatemala
Incidents of violence against women
Women in Guatemala
Lynching deaths
2015 crimes in Guatemala
Filmed killings
May 2015 events in North America
May 2015 crimes in South America
2010s murders in Guatemala